GRB2 associated binding protein 3 is a protein that in humans is encoded by the GAB3 gene.

Function

This gene is a member of the GRB2-associated binding protein gene family. These proteins are scaffolding/docking proteins that are involved in several growth factor and cytokine signaling pathways, and they contain a pleckstrin homology domain, and bind SHP2 tyrosine phosphatase and GRB2 adapter protein. The protein encoded by this gene facilitates macrophage differentiation. Alternative splicing results in multiple transcript variants.

References

Further reading